This is a list of statistical records for the Paraguay national football team.

Individual records

Player records 

Players in bold are still active at international level.

Most capped players

Top goalscorers

Competitive record

FIFA World Cup

 Champions   Runners-up   Third place   Fourth place  

*Draws include knockout matches decided via penalty shoot-out.

Copa América

Pan American Games

Head-to-head record
The list shown below shows the Paraguay national football team all-time international record against opposing nations. The stats are composed of FIFA World Cup and qualifiers, the Copa América, as well as numerous other international friendly tournaments and matches.

Updated to 19 November 2022 after the match against .

References

External links
 FIFA.com
 Worldfootball.net

Paraguay national football team
National association football team records and statistics